Michael McDermott (born 1974 in Belfast) is a Northern Irish former professional football player, and is currently the assistant manager to Carlos Queiroz at the Qatar national team. Dermott has held various coaching roles in professional football clubs as well as at the international level.

Early life 
McDermott attended Belfast Boys' Model School and played for Cliftonville and Distillery at youth levels. He won a soccer scholarship at the University of Rhode Island. He made three caps for Northern Ireland national under-18.

Playing career 
He has played in USL Second Division.

Coaching career 
He has held coaching positions at some of Asia's biggest Clubs; Al Ain FC (Abu Dhabi), Esteghlal FC (Tehran), Al Nasr FC (Dubai). Previously he was the Fitness Coach of Iran national football team during their successful World Cup 2014 qualification campaign. Prior to his second spell with the Iran National team, on 2 July 2017, he was appointed as the Assistant Manager of Iranian football club Esteghlal. After a brief spell as 'interim' Manager, on 30 October 2017 he terminated his contract with Esteghlal on mutual agreement.

After leaving Esteghlal FC he returned to the Iran National team / Team Melli to work alongside Carlos Queiroz as an Assistant Coach for the 2018 Russia World Cup and also for the Asian Cup 2019 in UAE where they were knocked out in the semi-final by Japan. When Queiroz became the head coach of Colombia in February 2019 it was announced that Mick would join him but an agreement was not reached with the Colombian FA.

On 31 March 2019, Mick took the job of Glentoran manager with imminent investment due to come into the club. Interim Manager Gary Smyth, who could no longer fulfil the role due to a lack of necessary UEFA coaching qualifications, returned to his former role as Assistant.

In his first full season as Glentoran manager, McDermott managed the club to victory in the Irish Cup final, defeating Ballymena United 2-1 and thus securing a place in the 2020-21 Europa League Preliminary round.

Mick McDermott strengthened his squad ahead of the 2020-21 season, signing Northern Ireland international Luke McCullough and Gibraltar goalkeeper Dayle Coleing, as well as Burundi midfielder Gaël Bigirimana. McDermott's side defeated Faroese side Havnar Bóltfelag 1-0 in the preliminary round, before being knocked out in a 5-1 defeat away to Scottish team Motherwell.

He was replaced by Rodney McAree as manager on 17 January 2023.

Managerial statistics

Personal life 
McDermott married to Karla in 1996, who was also a fellow student at University of Rhode Island and a U.S. citizen. As of 2019, the couple have two sons Malakai (9) and Michael Jr. (12); and two daughters Kiera (17) and Kali (19).

Honours

Managerial
Glentoran
 Irish Cup: 2019–20

Individual
 Atlantic 10 Conference Student-Athlete of the Year: 1995

References

External links
 Profile at soccerstats.us

1974 births
Living people
Oregon State Beavers men's soccer coaches
University of Rhode Island alumni
Association footballers from Belfast
Lisburn Distillery F.C. players
Long Island Rough Riders players
Raleigh (Capital) Express players
Association footballers from Northern Ireland
Football managers from Northern Ireland
Expatriate football managers from Northern Ireland
Expatriate football managers in Iran
Connecticut Wolves players
Cliftonville F.C. players
Quinnipiac Bobcats men's soccer coaches
Esteghlal F.C. managers
Glentoran F.C. managers
NIFL Premiership managers
Association football defenders
Rhode Island Rams men's soccer players
American people of Northern Ireland descent
People with acquired American citizenship
Northern Ireland youth international footballers
Expatriate soccer players in the United States